Llanosuchus is an extinct genus of notosuchian mesoeucrocodylian known from the Late Cretaceous Los Llanos Formation in Argentina. It contains a single species, L. tamaensis.

References 

Crocodylomorphs
Fossil taxa described in 2016
Cretaceous Argentina